The rosters of all participating teams at the men's tournament of the 2022 Rugby World Cup Sevens.

Argentina

Australia

Canada

Chile

England

Fiji

France

Germany

Hong Kong

Ireland

Jamaica

Kenya

New Zealand

Portugal

Samoa

Scotland

South Africa

South Korea

Tonga

Uganda

United States

Uruguay

Wales

Zimbabwe

References

External links
 Official Website

Rugby World Cup Sevens squads
2022 Rugby World Cup Sevens